Akustika Chamber Singers is a chamber choir from South Africa, consisting of 36 young adults, and is based in the capital, Pretoria.

Biography
Akustika was established in December 2005 by its current conductor Christo Burger. The choir strives towards the highest level of music production and contributes to the choral community of South Africa through by combining visual arts and choral music.

Choir members
The conductor and choir members are all alumni of various South African university and youth choirs. All choir members are subjected to a strict audition process in order to maintain the high standards required for honest music making.

Repertoire
The Akustika Chamber Singers' repertoire include a wide range of musical styles from Renaissance works through 20th and 21st century composed music, African traditional as well as improvisational repertoire.

In order to perform the latest South African music, Akustika Chamber Singers annually commission works from various well-known South African composers.

Projects
 Akustika was selected as one of 5 chamber choirs to work with the well-known Welsh composer, Karl Jenkins, performing the composer’s Mass for Peace: The Armed Man.
 Akustika performed at the 2008 Llangollen International Eisteddfod in Llangollen, Wales.

Recent collaborations
 Akustika Chamber Singers sang at the opening of South African sculptor Sanna Swart's exhibition "Evanesco".

International competitions
 Akustika Chamber Singers competed in the 2008 International Eisteddfod in Llangollen, Wales. The choir won the Mixed Choirs competition which enabled them to compete in the Choir of the World competition, which they also won.
 In 2010, Akustika Chamber Singers competed in the Concorso Corale Internazionale 2010 competition, in Riva del Garda Italy, where they were the A1 Category Winners, as well as the Grande Premio (overall) winners with an unprecedented 98.7%. Akustika also received a special prize from the jury for the outstanding performance of the work "Karimatanu Kuicha" by Ko Matsushita.
 At the 2018 World Choir Games in Tshwane Akustika Chamber Singers won the category C15, Musica Sacra a Capella, with a score of 91.75 points. The choir also won 3 other gold medals at the event.

Recordings
 Akustika released its first CD, "Akustika" in July 2007.

Concerts

External links 

 
 
  musiekTYD: Nuwe klassieke albums 

Culture of the City of Tshwane
Organisations based in Pretoria
South African choirs
Musical groups established in 2005